Word alignment may refer to:

 Word alignment (linguistics)
 Word alignment (computing)

See also
 Word boundary (disambiguation)